Kris McLaren (born 17 October 1986) is an Australian Grand Prix motorcycle racer.

Career statistics

By season

Races by year
(key) (Races in bold indicate pole position, races in italics indicate fastest lap)

References

External links
 Profile on motogp.com

Living people
1986 births
Australian motorcycle racers
Moto2 World Championship riders
Avintia Racing MotoGP riders
People from Leongatha
MotoGP World Championship riders